Modern School is a co-educational, private school in New Delhi, India. It was founded in 1920 by Lala Raghubir Singh, a prominent Delhi-based businessman and philanthropist, who desired an institution that combined the "best of ancient Indian tradition with the needs of the times." It was the first private and coeducational school established in Delhi after the capital of the British Raj shifted to the city. 

The school's first principal, Kamala Bose, was a vigorous advocate of educational reform in India. Her founding vision, coupled with Lala Raghubir Singh's nationalist leanings, gave the school a liberal and indigenous character that stood in contrast to colonially-inspired public schools, which were intended for Indian aristocracy. The school motto is "Nyaymatma Balheenien Labhya," which translates to "Self-realization cannot be achieved by the weak".

Modern School enrolls about 2,500 pupils, most admitted directly from its junior branch, the Raghubir Singh Junior Modern School. Students write the Central Board of Secondary Education examinations in the tenth grade, and the All India Senior School Certificate Examination(AISSCE) in the twelfth grade.

Modern School, Barakhamba Road is consistently ranked well among Indian schools. The primary branch attended by students through Grade 5 – Raghubir Singh Junior Modern School – was established in 1961 on a separate campus on Humayun Road, New Delhi. Although primarily a coeducational day school, the school provides campus housing for boys. 

Alumni, commonly known as Modernites, include some of India's most prominent politicians, government officials, and business leaders.

History

Origins
The founder, Lala Sundar Pandit Singh, was born in 1895 and educated by William W. Pearson, a Protestant educator. Lala was an established engineer and philanthropist and astronomer from the community. His father, Sardar Sultan Pandit Singh, an accountant and banker (khazanchi) with the Imperial Bank of India, was well-regarded by both the British and the Indian aristocracy. At the time of WW2 the Japanese had made it   a military camp,
destroyed by British Army.
To fulfill his son's dream of establishing a school that would combine Indian tradition with modern educational techniques, Sultan Singh bequeathed his mansion in Daryaganj, New Delhi to the school. The first classes started there in 1920.

Lala Raghubir Singh went on to partner with Sardar Sobha Singh, the developer charged with the construction of Delhi landmarks including Connaught Place, National Museum, South Block and India Gate, to develop a new campus. In 1932, the year after the construction of Lutyens' Delhi was completed, the school came to occupy its current  campus in the city center. 

A sister school, Modern School, Vasant Vihar, was established in South Delhi in 1975. Three additional National Capital Region campuses have since been established in Kundli, Haryana, Faridabad, Haryana, and Ghaziabad, Uttar Pradesh.

Principals
Reflecting its founder's pan-India vision, Kamala Bose, the school's first principal, was recruited from Calcutta (now Kolkata). Bose championed the need for better educational facilities in a country shaking off its colonial yoke, noting, "If the education imparted to the people has been seriously lacking in quantity, it has been still more sadly wanting in quality."

Modern School's longest-serving principal, Mr. M. N. Kapur, was a mentor to generations of students. In 1969 he was awarded one of India's highest civilian honors, the Padma Shri.

Principals:
 Kamala Bose, 1920–1947
 M.N. Kapur, 1947–1977
 Mr. Choudhary, 1977–1982
 S.P. Bakshi, 1977–1996
 R.K. Bhatia, 1996–2000
 Lata Vaidyanathan, 2000–2014
 Dr Vijay Datta, 2014–present

The crest
Designed by the artist Sarada Ukil, a teacher at Modern School in the 1920s, the school crest signifies the circle of eternity crossed by the three elements in human development: body, mind and spirit, as the sun shines between the triangle and the circle. Inside the triangle, there is a banyan tree to represent stability and firmness of character, the swan and the lotus represent refinement, culture, and the arts which are fundamental elements of progress in life.

Campus
The school occupies a single campus covering approximately twenty-five acres and is flanked by Maharaja Ranjit Singh Marg and Barakhamba Road in central New Delhi. To house the school at its present location, Lala Raghubir Singh made an application with the government for a suitable site on 28 April 1921. In response to the application, the government allocated fifty acres of land in the Delhi Cantonment for the purposes of the school. Due to its location in Old Delhi, the Cantonment was deemed far from the centre of the new city (at the time being constructed by Edwin Lutyens and Herbert Baker). Thus, after a second round of negotiations a 27-acre site was allotted to provide accommodation for 200 resident boys with staff quarters and ample play-fields.

The Main Building was designed by C.G. and F.B. Blomfield, architects on the team designing the imperial capital of New Delhi. The white and red aesthetic of the Edwardian Classical building at Modern School resembles many Delhi structures of the period, such as Convent of Jesus and Mary, St. Columba's School, Sacred Heart Cathedral (designed by Henry Medd), Flagstaff House (now Teen Murti Bhavan), and Lady Irwin School. It is now classified as a heritage structure exemplifying British colonial architecture.

Golden Jubilee Hostel
The school has a student dormitory capable of housing 90 boys.

Houses 
In keeping with its nationalist origins, the school's house system honours significant figures in the history of India, namely Akbar, Ashoka, Azad, Gandhi,Kalam, Lajpat, Laxmibai, Nehru, Patel, Pratap, Ranjit, Shastri, Shivaji, Subhas, Tagore, and Tilak.

School activities

Sports
Sports are an integral part of the school curriculum. The school has two large playing grounds, the Main Ground and the Cricket Field. Hockey, cricket, athletics, basketball, and association football are played throughout the school year. Tennis, table tennis, badminton, squash, and swimming are also available. 
Sport is dominated by Association Football or Soccer, Cricket, basketball, hockey, in which the schools competes nationally, at the state-level and Inter-school. Inter-house competitions stopped happening without any explanation. Sports facilities include an Olympic-size swimming pool, six clay tennis courts, three squash courts, an indoor and two outdoor basketball courts, facilities for indoor badminton and table tennis, two cricket pitches, two fields for hockey and football (which can be converted to cricket pitches to accommodate seasonal sports), and an athletic track.

Clubs and societies
Extracurricular activities are a compulsory element of school life at Modern. The school magazine, Sandesh, is published each school term in English and Hindi (its sister publications include the Vasant Prayag at Modern School, Vasant Vihar, and Prayas at Modern School, Kundli). There are around twenty clubs and societies, including photography, aero-modelling, drama, painting, sculpture, community service, carpentry, Dance, music, senior and junior English debating societies, economics, astronomy, computer science, physics, and robotics. In many societies pupils come together to discuss a particular topic, presided over by a faculty member and often including a guest speaker. The school has often invited prominent figures to give speeches and talks to the students; these have included heads of state, politicians, ornithologists, naturalists, artists, writers, economists, diplomats, and industrialists. The Modern School Leadership lecture series invites prominent alumni to address the school assembly twice every school year. Major clubs include The Lenskraft Photography Club, Model UN Society, Environment Club, Bits 'N' Bytes (The computer club), Debating Society, Interact Club, SPIC MACAY, Mudra Dance Club, SAPTAK and the Commerce Society.

Modern School is also a leading member of the Model United Nations and its biennial ModMUN conference is one of the biggest in Asia attracting as many as 900 international students for the 2016 conference. Due to its size, prestige, and popularity, it is considered the largest student organized MUN in India. Bits 'N' Bytes is one of the oldest school societies dating back to 1988. It organizes ACCESS, an annual tech symposium, in the month of December. In 2013, the society won the TCS IT Wiz and simultaneously celebrated its Silver Jubilee. The Debating Society is very active during the school year, as it hosts the Raghubir Singh Inter-school Debate, the Pratap Singh Inter-school Debate, and usually helps organize the Annual MSOSA Inter-school Debate. Interact Club (affiliate club of Rotary International's service club for students between the age of 12–18) was inaugurated in 1983 by the then vice-president of India, Muhammad Hidayat Ullah, and has since grown into a prominent school society. Its activities include donations to orphanages, recycling drives, ant-piracy drives, and an annual blood donation camp. The club has been awarded a certificate in recognition of its services to the community by Chief Minister of Delhi, Sheila Dikshit. Interact Club nominates some of its students to be selected by Rotary International for its international program to represent India as ambassador of goodwill to neighboring countries such as Pakistan and Sri Lanka. The selected students stay as guests with families who participate in this international youth exchange program. SPIC MACAY, a national society for the promotion of Indian classical music and culture amongst youth, organizes a SPIC MACAY week every school term. Past performers include Pandit Shiv Kumar Sharma, Ustad Bismillah Khan, Sonal Mansingh, Sitara Devi, Ustad Amjad Ali Khan, Hari Prasad Chaurasia, and Birju Maharaj.  Other events organized include Cyclotron (the annual inter-school physics symposium) and Unquestionably Modern (an annual quiz competition).

Model UN
Modern School revolutionised the concept of Model UN when the Model UN Society hosted its first conference in October 2011. Breaking all conventions, ModMUN 2011 which attracted over 100 international students from the world over, it went on to become not only the biggest MUN in Asia, but also one of great prestige. The following year ModMUN 2012 came back better than ever building on the success of ModMUN 2011, in 2013, ModMUN preceded their expectations achieving almost 900 students from around the globe. Modern School is also a leading member of the Model United Nations and its annual ModMUN conference is one of the biggest in Asia attracting as many as 1000 international students for the 2016 conference. Due to its size, prestige, and popularity, it is considered the largest student organized MUN in India.

Parallel to the successes of the conferences, the society which hosts it has also redefined the arena of Model UN. Since its inception, the Model UN Society of Modern School, Barakhamba road has gone on to make its presence felt in the most prestigious of conferences in the city, the country, and the world.

School magazine
The school takes out three publications, namely Sandesh, a biennial magazine, Red Brick Times, a monthly feature and the Chronicle, a weekly publication which encapsulates the events and achievements of the school and the students.

Theatre, music and dance
The school houses large venues for indoor productions; the Sir Shankar Lal Auditorium, the HLL (Hindustan Lever Limited) Auditorium and the M.N. Kapur Hall (formerly the gymnasium). The Amphitheatre adjoining the historic Banyan tree is used for common musical evenings, etc.

Traditions and lore
Like any established institution, Modern School has its fair share of traditions. For instance, during his tenure, Principal M.N. Kapur insisted all students sit cross legged on durries during morning assembly, a tradition that continues to this day. 

Drawing upon the long relationship between Modern School and St. Stephen's College, the Rudra Prize, established in 1928, honours S.K. Rudra, the first Indian principal of St. Stephen's College and one of the founding members of the school.

Affiliations

Ties with other schools
From its foundation in 1920, Modern School housed classes from Montessori to Grade 12. This ended in 1961 when Raghubir Singh Junior Modern School was established on Humayun Road as the school's primary wing. In 1975, Modern School, Vasant Vihar was founded as the first sister school under the leadership of Mr. Ved Vyas, a well regarded Hindi teacher at Modern School, Barakhamba Road. Similarly, in 2014, another sister school was established in Kundli under the directorship of Mrs. Neelam Puri, a former junior headmistress at Modern School, Barakhamba Road. In its early years the school also shared a close relationship with St. Stephen's College, Delhi.

The school has exchange programs with a number of overseas schools. As of September 2012, a small number of Modern School students were attending Brisbane Grammar School, Australia;Malay College, Malaysia; St. George's Girls' School, Malaysia; Clifton School, South Africa; and Peddie School, New Jersey, United States. Other schools include The Second High School Attached to Beijing Normal University and New Oriental School of Foreign Languages in China,  Liebigschule Gießen in Germany, Philippine Science High School in The Philippines, SMA Negari 4 Denser School in Indonesia, Chua Chu Kang Secondary School in Singapore, and Dominion High School in Virginia, United States. Since 2010, Modern has twinned with Chua Chu Kang Secondary School, Singapore under the Twinning Program. It is also a part of ISA, UKIERI, and Australia India Collaboration. Modern also collaborates with The Collegiate School, Richmond, Virginia, in organizing the Community Development and Leadership Summit and the International Emerging Leaders Conference.

Schools with similar names
"Modern" is commonly used in the names of several unrelated Indian schools.

Memberships
The Modern School is a member of the Indian Public Schools' Conference (IPSC), National Progressive Schools' Conference (NPSC), Round Square Conference and the Central Board of Secondary Education (CBSE).

Public image
Modern in Films, Television, and Theatre
In Shekhar Kapur's 1983 film Masoom, Rinky (Urmila Matondkar) and Minni (Aradhana Srivastav) are wearing Modern School uniforms in two scenes.
The radio station exteriors in the 2006 Bollywood film Rang De Basanti were shot at Modern School, Barakhamba Road.
Rajendra Theatre was used for Albert Brooks' stand-up performance sequence in the film Looking for Comedy in the Muslim World.
In Yeh Jawaani Hai Deewani, the lead characters Kabir Thapar, played by Ranbir Kapoor, and Naina Talwar, played by Deepika Padukone, are scripted as Modernites. They talk about their school days at Modern School, Barakhamba Road during the first half of the film.
In Hindi Medium, the protagonist Raj, played by Irrfan Khan, is trying to help his child get admitted to the (fictitious) Delhi Grammar school, which is portrayed at Modern School's campus; however, the name is avoided. Several scenes of the film were shot at the school's premises.

Modern in Literature
Khushwant Singh recounts his experiences being amongst the first batch of Modernites in his autobiography Truth, Love and a Little Malice. He also recollects many a school tale in Notes on the Great Indian Circus.
In Chetan Bhagat's, Half Girlfriend, the female protagonist, Riya Somani, is a Modernite.

Notable people

Alumni

Pupils of Modern School have gone on to achieve prominence in politics, government service, the armed forces of India, commerce, journalism, literature, academia, and the fine and performing arts. They include a prime minister, several Cabinet and Chief Ministers, numerous members of the Indian Parliament and State Legislative Assemblies, high-ranking military officials, of which include two Chiefs of Air Staff, and several ambassadors. The best-known alumnus is Indira Gandhi. In fact, Modern School has educated several members of the Nehru-Gandhi family. Rahul Gandhi and Priyanka Gandhi, children of former Prime Minister Rajiv Gandhi and Indian National Congress President Sonia Gandhi, attended Raghubir Singh Junior Modern School before enrolling in St. Columba's School and Convent of Jesus and Mary respectively. Similarly, cousin Varun Gandhi, son of Sanjay Gandhi and Maneka Anand Gandhi, completed his primary schooling here.

Notable Modern School alumni have held senior positions in Indian politics, bureaucracy, and judiciary, these include Sanjay Kishan Kaul, former Chief Justice of the Madras High Court, Madan Lokur, Supreme Court Judge, Mukul Rohatgi, former Attorney General of India, Gopal Krishna Gandhi, Governor of West Bengal and Bihar, Kamlesh Sharma, Indian High Commissioner to the United Kingdom, and Amitabh Kant, chairman of the Delhi-Mumbai Industrial Corridor project. In the defence services, Modern Alumni include S.K. Mehra and P.C. Lal, both former Air Chief Marshals of the Indian Air Force. In the field of journalism and literature, Modern boasts stalwart Khushwant Singh as alumni. Arun Shourie, former Cabinet Minister, Member of Rajya Sabha, editor of The Indian Express, and Barkha Dutt, Consulting Editor of NDTV, and Raghav Chadha, the national treasurer and spokesperson of the Aam Aadmi Party, are also Modern alumni.

Modern alumni have also made a mark in sports and entertainment. Golfers Daniel Chopra, Shiv Kapur, and Gaurav Ghei, cricketers Kirti Azad, Unmukt Chand, and Gautam Gambhir, tennis players Vishal Uppal and Karan Salwan, shooter Samresh Jung, and chess grandmaster Tania Sachdev are all ex-Modernites. In the arena of fine and performing arts Modern alumni include Yamini Reddy, Kuchipudi dancer, Abhay Sapori, Santoor maestro and music composer, film actress Amrita Singh, Amjad Ali Khan and his sons Ayaan and Amaan Ali Khan, Sarod exponents and music composers, Geeta Kapur, art historian, art critic and daughter of former principal, Mr. M.N. Kapur, actors Sanjana Sanghi, Mallika Dua, Amrita Singh, Priyamvada Kant, Arjit taneja, Karan Soni, and Alok Nath, filmmaker Shekhar Kapur, beauty pageant winner Ekta Choudhry.

Naresh Trehan, surgeon and chairman of Medanta, Noshir Minoo Shroff, eye surgeon, Aditi Shankardass, Neuroscientist, and Arvinder Singh Soin, liver transplant surgeon, represent Modern School alumni in the life and medical sciences. In business, Rajat Gupta, former managing director of McKinsey and Company and founder of the Indian School of Business, Gurcharan Das, CEO of Procter & Gamble, and Surinder Mehta, founder of Prime Group and a Padma Shri awardee are Modern School alumni.

Faculty 

 Sarada Ukil, artist, actor, and art teacher at Modern School, Barakhamba Road
 Ramkinkar Baij, widely known as one of the pioneers of modern Indian sculpture taught at the school
 Sukumar Bose, noted artist following in the tradition of the Bengal School of Art, taught art at the school through 1947

Modern School Old Students' Association
Modern School Old Students Association (MSOSA) brings together alumni. With over 15000 members, MSOSA has engaged in cultural and sporting activities to raise funds for supporting philanthropic activities, contributing to national causes including Kargil war relief in 1999, Gujarat earthquake relief in 2001, and tsunami relief in 2004. The Modernites Trust, MSOSA's philanthropic arm, provides merit scholarships to under-privileged students.

See also
The Doon School
St. Xavier's Collegiate School
The Mother's International School
Manav Sthali School

References

External links
 
 Raghubir Singh Junior Modern School website
 Modern School, Vasant Vihar website
 Modern School, Education City, National Capital Region (ECNCR)
 Modern School Old Students' Association website
 The Modernites Trust

Private schools in Delhi
Boarding schools in Delhi
Educational institutions established in 1920
1920 establishments in India
New Delhi